Haemimont Games AD is a Bulgarian video game developer founded by Gabriel Dobrev in September 1997 and based in Sofia. The company primarily focuses on producing simulation, city-building and ancient history strategy games but has developed titles in the role-playing genre as well. It has about 60 employees, making it Bulgaria's largest video game developer.

Games developed

References

External links 
 

Companies based in Sofia
Video game companies established in 1997
Video game development companies
Video game companies of Bulgaria
Bulgarian companies established in 1997